Cheers to the Fall is the debut studio album by American singer Andra Day. It was released on August 28, 2015 by Warner Bros. Records and Buskin Records. She worked with Jenn Decilveo, Adrian Gurvitz, Rob Kleiner, Raphael Saadiq, and Chris Seefried in the production of this album. The album was nominated for Best R&B Album at the 58th Annual Grammy Awards.

Critical reception

At Album of the Year, which assigns a normalized rating out of 100 to reviews from mainstream publications, the album received an average score of 63 based on 4 reviews. Awarding the album four stars at AllMusic, Andy Kellman states, "almost every selection has a distinguishing detail or two, whether it's a sly nod to a classic hip-hop artist, an unexpected place Day takes her dynamic voice, or some clever expression of heartache." Steven J. Horowitz, giving the album three and a half stars for Billboard, writes, "she shouldn't be dismissed as a carbon copy [of Amy Winehouse] – the LP, inspired by an eight-year relationship's end, is too genuinely intentioned and rife with regret. It's hard not to sympathize when she bemoans". Reviewing the album from The Boston Globe, Ken Capobianco describes, "This confident, stylish pop R&B record ushers in a sophisticated vocalist who faithfully reflects past influences while remaining contemporary and relevant." Camille Augustin, who pens a review of the album for Vibe, says, "The beauty in Andra's art is that the message applies to all. All we need to do is listen."

Track listing

Personnel
Credits adapted from AllMusic.

Musicians

 Billy Adamson – guitar
 Victor Axelrod – piano
 Kala Balch – background vocals
 Nick Barr – cello, viola
 Lemar Carter – drums
 Matt Chamberlain – drums
 Errol Cooney – guitar
 Rosie Danvers – cello, string arrangements
 Andra Day – lead vocals, background vocals
 Joe Crispiano – guitar
 Chris "Daddy" Dave – drums
 Kylie Davies – double bass
 Jenn Decilveo – bass
 DJ Jazzy Jeff – scratching
 Alison Dods – violin
 Lisa Dondlinger – violin
 Sean Erick – horn
 Jonathan Flaugher – bass
 Elizabeth Frascoia – trombone
 Cochemea Gastelum – baritone saxophone
 Adrian Gurvitz – drums, harmonica, piano, strings, vocals
 David Guy – trumpet
 Missi Hale – background vocals
 Sally Jackson – violin
 Bryony James – cello
 Chris Johnson – drums
 Charles Jones – organ, piano
 Patrick Kiernan – violin
 Rob Kleiner – bass, guitar, percussion, piano
 Keri Larson – background vocals
 Mika Lett – background vocals
 Timothy Loo – cello
 Jordan McLean – trumpet
 Leon Michels – saxophone
 Miles Mosley – bass
 David Paich – piano
 Pino Palladino – bass
 Dean Parks – guitar
 Jimmy Paxson – drums
 Kerenza Peacock – violin
 Hayley Pomfrett – violin
 Questlove – drums
 Zac Rae – piano
 Peter Randall – bass
 Raphael Saadiq – bass, drums, guitar, percussion
 Jenny Sacha – violin
 Bridget Sarai – background vocals
 Chris Seefried – guitar, Moog synthesizer, piano
 Sarah Sexton – violin
 Gus Seyffert – bass
 Onitsha Shaw – background vocals
 Leon Silva – horn
 Josh Smith – guitar
 Homer Steinweiss – drums
 Neal Sugarman – saxophone
 Calvin Turner – bass
 Fernando Velez – percussion
 Carl Wheeler – organ
 Bruce White – cello, viola
 Deborah Widdup – violin
 Kevin Williams – horn
 The Wired Strings – strings
 Dave Wood – guitar

Technical personnel

 Keith Armstrong – assistant
 Ryan Benton – A&R
 Tom Bilier – engineering
 Gerry "The Gov" Brown – mixing
 Bobby Campbell – mixing
 Adam Chagnon – mixing engineer
 Jon Chen – A&R
 Steve Churchyard – engineering
 Irie Cooper – mixing assistant
 Andra Day – executive production
 Jenn Decilveo – production, additional production
 Jeffrey Evans – executive production
 Jeff Fenster – A&R
 Michael Frondelli – engineering
 Brian "Big Bass" Gardner – mastering
 Adrian Gurvitz – executive production, production, additional production, engineering, programming
 Seth Atkins Horan – engineering
 Hotae Alexander Jang – mixing assistant
 Ben Kane – engineering
 Nik Karpen – assistant
 Rob Kleiner – production, vocal production, engineering, programming
 Chris Lord-Alge – mixing
 Tony Maserati – mixing
 Dan McCarroll – A&R
 James Poyser – additional production
 Alex Reid – programming
 Gabriel Roth – engineering
 Steve Rusch – mixing, engineering
 Raphael Saadiq – production
 Myriam Santos – creative direction, photography
 Andrew Schubert – mixing engineer
 Tyler Scott – mixing engineer
 Chris Seefried – production, vocal production, programming
 Ken Sluiter – engineering, second engineer
 Nick Taylor – engineering, string engineering
 Jonna Terrasi – A&R
 Stephen Walker – art direction
 Matt "Wiggy" Wiggers – mixing engineer

In other media

Day's song "Rise Up" has been used in numerous media:
 Serena Williams Beats ad campaign. (2015)
 The tenth and final episode in the Netflix series The Five (2016)
 The twenty-second episode "Mama Tried"  in season 12 of the medical drama, Grey's Anatomy (2016)
 A trailer for the 2016 film The Birth of a Nation 
 Hillary Clinton presidential campaign, 2016 as a theme song at campaigns and rallies.
 A trailer for the 2017 film Stronger.
 The ABC docudrama miniseries When We Rise, which chronicled the LGBT rights movement in America.
 During NBA player Paul Pierce's jersey number retirement ceremony with the Boston Celtics (2018)
 The episode "Rosa", in the science fiction television series Doctor Who (2018)
 The series finale of Big Brother (UK) (2018)
 The episode "Athena Begins" of 9-1-1 (2019)
 The end credits of "Me as Well" of Orange Is the New Black (2019)
 Sung at the end of the Disney+ movie Godmothered (2020)
In Vodafone's Christmas advert campaign (2020)
Performed by Alex Newell (as Mo) in the first episode "Zoey's Extraordinary Return" in season 2 of the musical comedy-drama Zoey's Extraordinary Playlist (2021)

"Rise Up" has frequently been covered on television talent shows around the world including:
 America's Got Talent: Angelica Hale
 American Idol: Just Sam (Season 18)
 Britain's Got Talent: Sarah Ikumu (Season 11) and The B-Positive Choir (Season 12) 
 The X Factor UK: Caitlyn Vanbeck & group performance. Kelsea Johnson (Season 14)
 The Voice:  Esera Tuaolo (Season 13), Aaliyah Rose (Season 12), Lauren Diaz (Season 11) and Tamar Davis (Season 10)
 Queen of the Universe: Grag Queen (Season 1) 
 Shulem Lemmer, the Hasidic Jewish icon, and the first Haredi Jew to sign with a major record label, released his own cover version as a single in 2020.

Live performances
In 2016 Day performed "Rearview" at the 2016 ESPY Awards during the In Memoriam tribute. In 2021, Day performed "Rise Up" during the virtual inaugural parade, commemorating the Inauguration of Joe Biden as the 46th President of the United States and again performed the song at the opening ceremony of Expo 2020 in Dubai, UAE on September 30, 2021.

Chart performance

Weekly charts

Year-end charts

References

2015 debut albums
Warner Records albums
Albums produced by Jennifer Decilveo